Hilgartner is a surname. Notable people with the surname include:

Jim Hilgartner, American author of poetry and fiction
Josef Hilgartner, Austrian luger